Halteriidae is a family of planktonic ciliates.

References 

Spirotrichea
Ciliate families